Benny Nielsen may refer to:

 Benny Nielsen (swimmer) (born 1966), Danish swimmer
 Benny Nielsen (boxer) (1934–1994), Danish boxer
 Benny Nielsen (footballer, born 17 March 1951), Danish football player
 Benny Nielsen (footballer, born 7 March 1951), Danish football player